Mr. White may refer to:
 Mr. White, the Marvel Comics character
 "Mr. White" a song by Khruangbin
 Mr. White Mr. Black (film), A Bollywood film
 Mr. White (James Bond), A James Bond character
 Lawrence Dimmick, A character from the film Reservoir Dogs (known as Mr. White)
 Walter White (Breaking Bad), a fictional character in the American television drama series Breaking Bad also known as Mr. White